"Love Kills" is a song by Freddie Mercury, and his first song released as a solo artist, though the other members of Queen appeared on the song - initially uncredited. 

Written by Mercury and Giorgio Moroder, it was originally used in Moroder's 1984 restoration and edit of Fritz Lang's 1927 silent film Metropolis, as part of the film's new soundtrack. In 1985, the film was nominated at the 5th Golden Raspberry Awards for Worst Musical Score, and the song itself was nominated for Worst Original Song. Nevertheless, the single reached number ten on the UK Singles Chart. 

Officially, the single has only ever been credited to Freddie Mercury, despite it being a collaboration with Moroder. In 2000, the liner notes of the Freddie Mercury boxset The Solo Collection confirmed that Brian May and Roger Taylor contributed guitar and drums to the track, and many years later, the 2019 compilation Never Boring confirmed that the fourth member of Queen, John Deacon also performed on the song, contributing additional guitar parts. There has been no confirmation as to why the track was released credited solely to Mercury and not as a Queen single, but the band's contract with EMI Records worldwide (and Capital Records in the USA) may have contributed to this, as the Metropolis soundtrack was released on CBS Records, who would go on to sign Freddie as a solo artist for the 1985 album Mr. Bad Guy.

The song was never performed live in any concert or event. Queen + Adam Lambert performed the song live for the very first time on the North American leg of their tour in 2014 as a ballad. That version was later reworked by Brian May & Roger Taylor with the original vocals by Mercury for the album Queen Forever in 2014.

A remix of "Love Kills" was also used for the closing credits of the 1993 film Loaded Weapon 1. This version was the Richard Wolf Mix as found on the compilation album The Great Pretender. In 2009, a cover version by English synthpop singer Little Boots was included on her extended plays Little Boots and Illuminations.

The B-side, "Rotwang's Party (Robot Dance)" was written and performed by Moroder. Although used in his rendition of Metropolis, it was not included in the film's soundtrack album.

Track listings

Personnel
Freddie Mercury – vocals, synthesizers
Reinhold Mack – synthesizers, programming
Giorgio Moroder – synthesizers, programming
Brian May - lead guitar
John Deacon - additional guitar
Roger Taylor - percussion

Queen version

A previously unreleased ballad version of the song was reworked by Brian May and Roger Taylor for the compilation Queen Forever. The Queen version is a stripped-down ballad version, while Mercury's version is a high energy track. "Love Kills" was considered for inclusion on the occasion of Queen's eleventh studio album The Works, but was not used.

Personnel
Freddie Mercury – lead vocals
Giorgio Moroder - keyboard
Brian May – guitars, keyboards,  bass guitar
Roger Taylor – drums
John Deacon – additional guitars

Remixes
 "Love Kills (Wolf remix)" was found in a promotional CD issued only in the United States in 1992.
 "Love Kills (Pixel '82 remix)" and "Love Kills (More Oder Rework by The Glimmers)" can both be found in the UK double-CD release of the 2006 compilation album Lover of Life, Singer of Songs: The Very Best of Freddie Mercury Solo
 Several remixes of the track are found in the 2006 Love Kills (remix) singles released in various European countries, with different track lists:
 "Love Kills (Sunshine People Radio remix)"
 "Love Kills (Star Rider remix)"
 "Love Kills (Rank 1 Radio remix)"
 "Love Kills (Sunshine People Club remix)"

Charts

Sunshine People Remix 2006 version

References

1984 debut singles
1984 songs
CBS Records singles
Virgin EMI Records singles
Freddie Mercury songs
Little Boots songs
Song recordings produced by Giorgio Moroder
Song recordings produced by Reinhold Mack
Songs written for films
Songs written by Freddie Mercury
Songs written by Giorgio Moroder
Works based on Metropolis (1927 film)